Hywel Evans may refer to:
 Hywel Evans (figure skater)
 Hywel Evans (civil servant)
 Hywel David Evans, Australian politician